Pelham Bay Naval Training Station was a World War I-era United States Navy training facility located in Pelham Bay Park's Rodman's Neck in the Bronx. Located near City Island, and Westchester county, it was operational from 1917 to 1919.

History 
Prior to the creation of the Pelham Bay Naval Training Station, a national guard base was set up in the heart of Pelham Bay Park. 
The 280 acre site was designed by the architectural firm of Ewing & Allen and included a ninety acre hospital.

The camp also featured entertainment facilities provided by the Knights of Columbus, the Y.M.C.A., and other organizations including the American Red Cross and the American Library Association.

Curriculum 
The camp offered a number of sequential training courses, with mastery of a given course being required to advance to the next one.

 First: Inoculation period of 21 days in the Isolation Camp (also known as the "Probation Camp").  During this time, the trainee also learned about naval regulations and some basic seamanship topics.
 Second: Month-long seamanship course.
 Third: If qualified - Three weeks of either Petty Officer's School, Radio school, Quartermaster School, Gunnery School, or Boatswain Mate schools.
 Fourth: If qualified - Two months of Officers' Material School or the Naval Auxiliary School.

Influenza pandemic of 1918 
The camp suffered from the Influenza pandemic of 1918 from late 21 September through late 21 October 1918, and again in December 1918. There were 2,399 cases of influenza, with a total of 145 deaths.

Personnel

Commandants 

  Commander William B. Franklin until 25 February 1919
  Captain Julian Lane Latimer, captain of USS Rhode Island, assumed command of the Pelham Bay Naval Training Station New York, 25 February 1919 - later Judge Advocate General of the Navy 1921 - 1925

Librarians 
A number of Queens Borough Public Library staff members took a leave of absence, and were placed at the Naval station via the efforts of the American Library Association. The station's library staff included:
 Blanche Galloway - Librarian. Queens Borough Public Library Jamaica Branch Librarian.
 Wilhelmina Harper - Assistant librarian. Queens Borough Public Library Jamaica Branch Children's librarian.
 Amy E. Doncourt - Hospital librarian. Queens Borough Public Library Flushing Branch assistant librarian.

Other personnel 

 Richard W. Dorgan - served at the naval station.
 James F. Duffy - served at the naval station.
 Humphrey Bogart - The actor was one of the trainees.
 Edward G. Robinson - The actor was one of the trainees.

See also 
 USS Idalis (SP-270) - A Bronx built ship that was used for training and patrol duties.
 J. Rich Steers, Inc. - Then known as Henry Steers, Inc. constructed some or all of the barracks.

References

Further reading 

  – An eyewitness account of the training station by one of the American Red Cross nurses

Training installations of the United States Navy
Military facilities in the Bronx
Demolished buildings and structures in the Bronx
Pelham Bay Park
1910s in the Bronx
Installations of the United States Navy in New York City
Military installations closed in 1919
United States Navy in the 20th century
Closed installations of the United States Navy
1917 establishments in New York City
1919 disestablishments in New York (state)
World War I sites in the United States
Military history of New York City